Glamoč fortress (Bosnian, Croatian and Serbian: Glamočka tvrđava / Гламочка тврђава) is a medieval fortress located on the north slopes of Staretina mountain just above town of Glamoč. The construction of the fortress started as early as 14th century.

Gallery

References

Buildings and structures in Glamoč
Castles in Bosnia and Herzegovina
National Monuments of Bosnia and Herzegovina
Forts in Bosnia and Herzegovina